Untold is a news program, hosted by Maria Menounos, that premiered on E! at 8:00 PM Eastern/7:00 PM Central on July 17, 2014. It was a format that focused on deeper investigations, and was filmed on location.

References

External links
 

2014 American television series debuts
E! original programming